The Southdown is a British breed of domestic sheep, the smallest of the British breeds. It is a shortwool breed, and the basis of the whole Down group of breeds. It was originally bred by John Ellman of Glynde, near Lewes in East Sussex, in about 1800. It has been exported to many countries; it has been of particular importance in New Zealand, where it was used in the breeding of Canterbury lamb. In the twenty-first century it is kept principally as a terminal sire.

It is listed by the Rare Breeds Survival Trust among the UK native breeds; it was formerly listed as "priority" or "at risk".

History 

From Mediaeval times, small grey-faced polled sheep were kept on the chalk uplands of the South Downs of the counties of Kent and Sussex in south-east England. From about 1780 John Ellman, of Glynde, near Lewes in East Sussex, began selectively breeding them to improve their productive qualities; there are no records of how this breeding was carried out. By the end of the century the breed had become well known, its reputation rivalling that of the Dishley Leicester bred by Robert Bakewell. In the nineteenth century further selective breeding was carried out by Jonas Webb, of Babraham in Cambridgeshire, with such success that the breed was at times known as the Cambridgeshire. 

This sheep was involved with crossbreeding to develop other breeds:

with the Wiltshire Horn and the Berkshire Nott, the Hampshire,
via the Hampshire and the Cotswold sheep, the Oxford Down
with the Norfolk Horn, the Suffolk.

Characteristics

Use 

The Southdown was traditionally reared for meat and wool. During the day the sheep pastured freely on the downs, and at night they were close-folded in the arable fields of the farmers, where they helped to increase soil fertility.

In California and New Zealand, they are placed in vineyards to graze weeds because they are too short to reach the grapes on the vines.

References

Sheep breeds
Sheep breeds originating in England